Gabriel or Gabe García may refer to:

Gabriël Garcia (cyclist) (1903–1970), Spanish cyclist
Gabriel García Moreno (1821–1876), Ecuadorian statesman who twice served as President of that country
Gabriel García Márquez (1927–2014), Colombian novelist, journalist, publisher, and political activist
Gabriel García de la Torre (born 1979), nicknamed Gabri, Spanish football player
Gabriel Garcia, lead singer of Black Tide
Gabe Garcia, runner up on season 6 of Nashville Star
Gabe Garcia (soccer), American soccer forward
Gabbi Garcia, Filipino actress and host
Gabi Garcia, Brazilian Jiu-Jitsu practitioner and mixed martial artist from Brazil